The Other Woman (also known as Mothers and Daughters), is a 1995 television film.  Nancey Silvers was nominated for the Humanitas Prize in the "Prime Time 90 Minute" category for writing the film.

Plot
After Tessa Bryan (Jill Eikenberry) is diagnosed with terminal pancreatic cancer, she attempts to ensure that her two young daughters, Lara and Kate, accept her ex-husband Michael's second wife Carolyn. To do so, she takes them on a trip across the country to her father's ranch.

Cast 

 Jill Eikenberry as Tessa: A 48 year-old mother to Lara and Kate who is diagnosed with late-stage terminal cancer and is Michael's ex-wife.
 Laura Leighton as Carolyn Bryan: A 27 year old model who wrecked Tessa and Michael marriage. She becomes Michael's new wife and future stepmother to Lara and Kate.
 James Read as Michael Bryan: A 42 year-old successful businessman, father to Lara and Kate, Tessa's ex-husband and Carolyn's husband.
 Sarah Martineck as Lara Bryan: Tessa and Michael’s biological daughter and Carolyn's stepdaughter.
 Lindsay Parker as Kate Bryan: Tessa and Michael’s biological daughter and Carolyn's stepdaughter.
 Lloyd Bridges as Jacob: Tessa's father.

External links 

1995 television films
1995 films
1995 drama films
Films about cancer
Films directed by Gabrielle Beaumont
American drama television films
1990s English-language films
1990s American films